Trotsky's train was the personal armoured train of Leon Trotsky while he was the Soviet People's Commissar of Defense. In 1918 Trotsky had a train that was formerly used by one of the Tsar's ministers of communication converted into an armored train for him to quickly visit areas in the Russian civil war where the Red Army needed leadership. The train included a telegraph station, a library, a printing house, a radio station, an electric power station, a squad of picked sharpshooters and machine gunners, and an automobile garage. The staff on the train included many Soviet military and civilian procurement specialists. A special newspaper – En Route, which served as agitation for the Red Army – was published in it. The armored train contributed to the formation of the Red Army and the subsequent consolidation of the power of the Bolsheviks in Soviet Russia. The train was awarded the highly prestigious Decoration of the Red Flag in honor of the work that it and its crew performed during the civil war.

References

Sources and further reading 
 Heyman N. M. Leon Trotsky and the Birth of the Red Army // Army Quarterly and Defence Journal. 1975. Vol 105, No. 4. pp. 407–418.
 Heyman N. M. Leon Trotsky : propagandist to the Red Army // Studies in Comparative Communism: Trotsky and Trotskyism in perspective. Los Angeles, Cal.: Univеrsity of Southern California, 1977. Vol. 10, No. 1–2. pp. 34–43. DOI:10.1016/S0039-3592(77)80073-2.
 Leon Trotsky's Armored Train // Russia in war and revolution, 1914—1922 : a documentary history / ed. J. W. Daly, L. T. Trofimov. Indianapolis, Ind.: Hackett, 2009. .
 Tarkhova N. S. Trotsky's Train. Unknown Page in the History of the Civil War // The Trotsky Reappraisal / ed. by T. Brotherstone and P. Dukes. Edinburgh: Edinburgh University Press, 1992. .
 Winsbury R. Trotsky's War Train // History Today Magazine. 1975. August, Vol. 2, No. 8. pp. 523–531.

Leon Trotsky
Russian Civil War
Armoured trains